Gates of Gold is the fifteenth studio album by the American rock band Los Lobos, released in September 2015. It was released worldwide through 429 Records and in Europe through Proper Records. It is the band's first full-length studio album since 2010's Tin Can Trust.

Track listing

Personnel
Credits adapted from the album's liner notes.

Los Lobos
 David Hidalgo – vocals, guitar, drums, bass, keyboards
 Cesar Rosas – vocals, guitar, bajo sexto
 Louie Pérez – guitar, jarana
 Conrad Lozano – bass
 Steve Berlin – saxophones, keyboards

Additional musicians
 David Hidalgo Jr. – drums
 Syd Straw – backing vocals (1)
 Marcos J. Reyes – percussion (1, 2, 4, 6, 8)
 Mitchell Froom – keyboards (2, 7)
 Oscar Utterstrom – trombone (2)
 Sammy Avila – organ (3, 6, 10), piano (10)
 Robert Crowell – alto saxophone (5)
 Josh Baca – accordion (6)
 Juan Perez – bass (6, 10)

Technical
 Los Lobos – producer
 Shane Smith – engineer, mixing (except 1)
 Darren Frandsen – assistant engineer
 Matt Jacobson – assistant engineer
 Jesse Druehl – assistant engineer
 Joe Trevino – additional engineer
 Adam Landry – additional engineer
 Cesar Rosas – additional engineer, photography
 Dave Beeman – additional engineer
 Stephen Koszler – additional engineer
 Niko Bolas – mixing (1)
 Dave McNair – mastering (except 3, 6, 8, 10)
 Stephen Marsh – mastering (3, 6, 8, 10)
 Mando Tavares – production coordination
 Al Quattrocchi – art direction
 Jeff Smith – art direction
 Tornado Design – art direction
 Louie Pérez – photography
 John Gilhooley – photography
 Noé Montes – photography

References

Los Lobos albums
2015 albums
429 Records albums
Proper Records albums